The Tata Winger is a light commercial van produced by the Indian automaker Tata Motors in 2007. It is a rebadged version of the Renault Trafic Mk1 Phase 3 van, but fitted with Tata's own 2 litre diesel engines, competing with the Volkswagen Transporter, Mercedes-Benz MB100, Ford Transit, Toyota Hiace, and the ГАЗ Соболь.

First Generation (2007-2019)
The Winger is offered in six variants and two seating configuration: long or short wheelbase, high and low roof versions and also specialised ambulance and school bus versions, as well as the plain panel van. The top of the range is a flat roof, air-conditioned variant is a ten-seater, while the remaining five versions are offered as either 13 or 14 seaters, taking the total number of variants to 11.

The Winger is powered by a modified version of the 2.0 litre diesel engine that is currently offered on the Tata Sumo. This 1948 cc engine comes with a turbo-charged, inter-cooled (TCIC) version in all the variants, except in the smaller length, entry-level Winger van.

The non-turbo-charged version of the engine develops a peak power of  compared to the  that the TCIC version puts out. The Winger meets Bharat Stage VI emission standards, except for the base variant, which is BS-VI compliant. The ambulance model was certified to meet BS-IV standards.

Second Generation (2020- )
Second generation Tata Winger is offered with three wheelbases(2800, 3200 and 3488), two roof heights and four use cases. Both air conditioned and non air conditioned variants are available. Seating capacity varies from 9 seater to 20 seater. Winger is powered by a BS-VI(Euro-6) compliant 2.2 litre turbo diesel engine producing 99 PS and 200 N-m of torque. It uses a semi-hydraulic actuated dry clutch.

Transmission and suspension
The Winger van is front-wheel-driven, with the engine mounted longitudinal. A five-speed transaxle engine is used. The Winger's suspension is MacPherson strut up front with a beam axle with parabolic leaf springs at the rear.

References

External links

  Tata Winger Multi-Purpose Vehicle

2010s cars
Ambulances
Cars introduced in 2007
Minibuses
Winger
Vans